Kim Kyu-young (1937-25 November 2015) served as the Director of the Korea Scout Association from 1982 to 1991 and Regional Director of the Asia-Pacific Region of the World Scout Bureau from 1990 to 2002.

In 2002, Kim was awarded the 291st Bronze Wolf, the only distinction of the World Organization of the Scout Movement, awarded by the World Scout Committee for exceptional services to world Scouting.

He was eulogized by Scott Teare, WOSM Secretary General.

References

External links

https://web.archive.org/web/20120219003345/http://www.scout.org/en/content/download/3618/33001/file/bwawards.pdf
kyobobook.co.kr 

Recipients of the Bronze Wolf Award
1937 births
2015 deaths
Scouting in South Korea
South Korean writers
Hongik University alumni
People from Gangwon Province, South Korea
World Scout Committee members